Down Under Donovan is a 1922 British silent crime film directed by Harry Lambart and starring Cora Goffin, W.H. Benham and Bertram Parnell. It is based on the 1918 novel of the same title by Edgar Wallace.

Cast
 Cora Goffin as Mary President  
 W.H. Benham as Eric Stanton  
 Bertram Parnell as Milton Sands  
 William Lugg as John President  
 W.H. Willitts as Ivan Soltikoff  
 Cecil Rutledge as John Partridge  
 Peggy Surtees as Mrs. Bud Kitson 
 John Monkhouse as Sir George Frodmere

References

Bibliography
 Goble, Alan. The Complete Index to Literary Sources in Film. Walter de Gruyter, 1999.
 Low, Rachael. The History of the British Film 1918-1929. George Allen & Unwin, 1971.

External links
 

1922 films
1922 crime films
British crime films
British silent feature films
Films based on British novels
Films based on works by Edgar Wallace
Stoll Pictures films
British black-and-white films
1920s English-language films
1920s British films